Široka Kula is a village in the Gospić municipality in the Lika region of central Croatia, Lika-Senj County. It is located near Gospić, connected by the D25 highway.

History
During the WWII Genocide of Serbs by the Croatian fascist Ustaše regime, more than 400 Serbs were massacred in Široka Kula.

Demographics

The 2011 census registered  116 residents.

See also
 Široka Kula massacre

Notable natives and residents
 Marko Orešković (1895–1941) - antifascist Partisan; People's Hero of Yugoslavia

References

Populated places in Lika-Senj County
Serb communities in Croatia